Morten "Molle" Rasmussen (born 26 March 1985) is a Danish professional footballer who plays as a defender. He last played for Fremad Amager in the Danish 1st Division.

Club career 
Morten Rasmussen debuted for Brøndby's first team 2 October 2005 against AC Horsens. He has mostly been used as a central defender, but after Mark Howard joined Brøndby's squad in June 2006, Rasmussen has been playing the back position.

Currently the 188 cm tall defender is noted for a total of 25 appearances and 1 goal for Brøndby. He has appeared in the national Superliga championship, as well as the national Danish Cup and the international UEFA Cup tournament. His talent has not only taken him to the first team in Brøndby; In August 2006, he made his debut for the Denmark under-21 national football team.

References

Molle drager til Fremad Amager, bold.dk, 28 January 2016

External links
Danish national team profile
Official Superliga stats

1985 births
Living people
Danish men's footballers
Denmark under-21 international footballers
Brøndby IF players
AC Horsens players
Danish Superliga players
Association football forwards
People from Hvidovre Municipality
Sportspeople from the Capital Region of Denmark